The Somerville West Ends were a minor league baseball team based in Somerville, New Jersey. In 1891 and 1892, the West Ends played exclusively members of the Central New Jersey League, winning the 1892 championship.

History
The Central New Jersey League was formed for the 1891 season as an Independent level minor league. The exact teams and statistics of the 1891 season are unknown, but it is reported the Plainfield Crescent Cities with Baseball Hall of Fame player Willie Keeler won the championship, while Somerville and Westfield played in the league as well.

The Somerville West Ends continued play in the four–team 1892 Central New Jersey League. Somerville began play in the Independent level league on May 26, 1892. The Somerville West Ends joined the Elizabeth team from Elizabeth, New Jersey, Plainfield Crescent Cities, and Westfield Athletics from Westfield, New Jersey in league play.

The season concluded on September 24, 1892, with Somerville tied for 1st place, playing under manager Mack. The Elizabeth and Westfield franchises had both disbanded on September 3, 1892 with 5–11 records. The Somerville West Ends and Plainfield Crescent Cities were in a tie for 1st place with 12–6 records. However, the Plainfield franchise disbanded before a playoff with Somerville could be played.

Former and future major league players Jack Farrell, Jocko Fields, George Gore, and Jack Sharrott played for the 1892 Somerville West Ends.

The Central New Jersey League permanently folded following the 1892 season. Somerville has not hosted another minor league team.

The ballpark

The name and location of the Somerville West Ends' minor league home ballpark is unknown.

Timeline

Year–by–year records

Notable alumni

Jack Farrell (1892)
Jocko Fields (1892)
George Gore (1892)
Jack Sharrott (1892)

See also
Somerville West Ends players

References

External links
Baseball Reference

Defunct minor league baseball teams
Defunct baseball teams in New Jersey
Baseball teams established in 1891
Baseball teams disestablished in 1892
Central New Jersey League teams
Somerville, New Jersey
Somerset County, New Jersey